Dry cocoa solids are the components of cocoa beans remaining after cocoa butter, the fatty component of the bean, is extracted from chocolate liquor, roasted cocoa beans that have been ground into a liquid state. Cocoa butter is 46% to 57% of the weight of cocoa beans and gives chocolate its characteristic melting properties. Cocoa powder is the powdered form of the dry solids with a small remaining amount of cocoa butter. Untreated cocoa powder is bitter and acidic. Dutch process cocoa has been treated with an alkali to neutralize the acid.

Cocoa powder contains flavanols, amounts of which are reduced if the cocoa is subjected to acid-reducing alkalization.

Other definitions of cocoa solids include all cocoa ingredients (cocoa mass, cocoa powder and cocoa butter). In this case, cocoa solids without cocoa butter are specified as non-fat cocoa solids.

Physical properties

Natural cocoa
Natural cocoa powder is extracted with the Broma process where after the cocoa fats have been removed from the chocolate nibs the remaining dry cocoa beans are ground into cocoa powder, which is sold to consumers. Natural cocoa powder has a light-brown color and an extractable pH of 5.3 to 5.8.

Because of its acidity, natural cocoa is often paired in recipes with baking soda. This neutralizes the acidity and creates carbon dioxide which in cakes helps them rise.

Dutch process cocoa

Dutch process cocoa or Dutched cocoa is cocoa powder that has been treated with an alkalizing agent to modify its color, neutralize its pH and give it a milder taste compared to "natural cocoa". It forms the basis for much of modern chocolate, and is used in ice cream, hot chocolate, and baking.

The alkalization process reduces bitterness and improves solubility, which is important for beverage product applications. Alkalizing agents employed vary, but include potassium carbonate or sodium carbonate.

Nutrition 

Cocoa powder is 58% carbohydrates, 14% fat, 20% protein, and 3% water (table). It contains several minerals in rich content (having a Daily Value of 20% or higher), including manganese, magnesium, phosphorus, potassium, iron, and zinc, while calcium levels are moderate (table).

Flavonoids 

Cocoa powder is rich in flavonoids (especially flavan-3-ols), a subset of polyphenols. The amount of flavonoids depends on the amount of processing and manufacturing the cocoa powder undergoes. Alkalization, also known as Dutch processing, causes its content of flavonoids to be substantially reduced.

Safety

Cadmium content
Cocoa powders may contain cadmium, a toxic heavy metal and probable carcinogen, found naturally in high levels in the soil of some regions of cocoa-producing countries. The European Union has imposed a limit (as of 1 January 2019) for cadmium in cocoa powder of 0.6 µg per gram of cocoa powder and 0.8 µg per gram for chocolate with ≥ 50% total dry cocoa solids. In Canada, a daily serving of a natural health product must contain no more than 6 µg of cadmium for an individual weighing  and 3 µg for a  individual. While the US government has not set a limit for cadmium in foods or health products, the state of California has established a maximum allowable daily level of oral cadmium exposure of 4.1 µg and requires products containing more than this amount per daily serving to bear a warning on the label. One investigation by an independent consumer testing laboratory found that seven of nine commercially available cocoa powders and nibs selected for testing contained more than 0.3 µg of cadmium per serving gram; five of these products exceeded the EU limit of 0.6 µg per gram.

See also
 Baking chocolate
 Chocamine

References

External links 
 

Components of chocolate
Food powders

az:Kakao